Anders Fjelstad (10 October 1879 – 1955) was a Norwegian politician for the Centre Party, then called Bondepartiet (The Farmers' Party). He was consultative councillor of state 1940–1943 in the exile Nygaardsvold's Cabinet.

References

1879 births
1955 deaths
Centre Party (Norway) politicians